S9902 Xinle-Yuanshi Expressway also known as S9902 Xinyuan Expressway is an expressway in Hebei, China. The expressway was formerly part of G4 Jinggang'ao Expressway, but with the opening of a new section bypassing Shijiazhuang and its assignment as G4 Jinggang'ao Expressway, the section running through eastern areas of Shijiazhuang downgraded from national-level to provincial-level and was renamed S9902.

Detailed itinerary

References

Expressways in Hebei